The panung is a traditional garment worn in Thailand. It is a long strip of cloth, described in 1921 by the US vice-consul as "a piece of cotton cloth 3 by 10 feet" is wrapped around the waist, reaching below the knees. The cloth is sometimes passed between the legs and tucked at the back in a fashion known as chong kraben. The garment is normally paired with a pha hom, a similar cloth used to cover the upper body.

See also
 Sarong
 Pathin

References 

Thai culture
Thai clothing